Gordy Combs (born April 3, 1950) is a former American football coach. He was the head coach of the Towson Tigers football team from 1992 through 2008. He had spent 19 seasons as an assistant coach to Phil Albert at Towson before taking over when Albert retired. Combs was replaced in 2009 by Rob Ambrose. He spent the next four years as a defensive assistant at nearby Johns Hopkins University.  He helped the team to the postseason all four years he was there.  He retired after 2013 season.

Head coaching record

References

1950 births
Living people
Dayton Flyers football players
Johns Hopkins Blue Jays football coaches
Towson Tigers football coaches
Towson Tigers football players
Sportspeople from Baltimore
Coaches of American football from Maryland
Players of American football from Maryland